Brockport is a village in the Town of Sweden, with two tiny portions in the Town of Clarkson, in Monroe County, New York, United States. The population was 7,104 at the 2020 U.S. Census. The name is derived from Heil Brockway, an early settler. It is also home to The College at Brockport, State University of New York.

The village is north of the junction of New York State Route 19 (north-south) and New York State Route 31 (east-west) on the Town of Sweden's northern line.

Brockport calls itself "The Victorian Village on the Erie Canal".  Brockport recently remodeled the village portion of the Erie Canal, providing a bricked walkway, a brand new canal visitor's center, and several pieces of art.

History 
Prior to European settlement, the area that makes up modern Brockport was primarily occupied by the Muoio Indian tribe, a part of the Seneca (a member of the Iroquois Confederacy). The Muoio people were sustained in the region mostly by hunting indigenous wildlife such as deer and the occasional black bear. Shortly after white settlers arrived, most of the Muoio died of disease and the few survivors traveled to Canada.

The Village of Brockport was founded by Heil Brockway in 1822 and later incorporated in 1829. The village grew to importance as a port on the Erie Canal. Brockport was briefly the canal's terminus until the canal's western end was complete.

The Brockport Collegiate Institute was founded in 1841. It was a private "academy," part of the widespread academy movement of the time. In October 1869, Gamma Sigma Fraternity was founded at the Brockport Normal School. Gamma Sigma was the first high school fraternity started in the United States. SUNY Brockport officially called "College at Brockport, State University of New York", is the descendant of that institute. It boasts the Morgan Manning House, a Victorian era home built in 1854, on Main Street (NY 19).

During the American Civil War the men of Brockport formed all of Company A (100 men) of the 140th New York Volunteer Infantry Regiment formed in September 1862 at Rochester, New York. Brockport's total population was little more than 2100 people at the time. Additional volunteers from Brockport helped form Company H of the 140th New York Volunteer Infantry Regiment. Company A's heroics helped secure the flank of the 5th Maine and stabilized a bad situation on Little Round Top at the Battle of Gettysburg. The 140th New York regiment also saw battle at the Battle of the Wilderness, the Battle of Spotsylvania Court House, and the Appomatox Courthouse Campaign. The 140th New York Volunteer Infantry Regiment was mustered out on June 3, 1865, near Alexandria, Virginia.

There has long been a legend that due to a conflict between two of Brockport's founders, there are no intersections on Main Street that meet up squarely. This is not true, since State Street and Erie street line up because they used to be a trolley path that ran all the way to Rochester. Adams Street and Fair street meet up as well, and so do the streets of Brockway Place and South Avenue.

Due to financial difficulties the village was under threat of dissolution, and could have become a part of the town of Sweden pending a referendum by the village's residents, but the referendum failed on June 15, 2010. However, there was another dissolution vote on May 24, 2016, which was also failed, filed by resident Rhett King on January 25, 2016. Village clerk Leslie Ann Morelli certified the petition and found 339 signatures that are registered voters. There was to be a study; however, it was rejected.

Sites of interest
The Erie Canal runs through the village of Brockport, as well as several other area villages and towns.

Main Street (Route 19) has many historical buildings, and is a tourist attraction. The Erie Canal Boardwalk that runs from Main Street along the canal is a common spot for locals to enjoy a stroll.

The Morgan-Manning House houses the Western Monroe Historical Society and was listed on the National Register of Historic Places in 1991. Brockport has the following places listed on the National Register of Historic Places: Brockport Central Rural High School (currently A.D. Oliver Middle School), First Baptist Church, First Presbyterian Church, Edward Harrison House, Lake View Cemetery, Main Street Historic District, Park Avenue and State Street Historic District, Soldiers' Memorial Tower, St. Luke's Episcopal Church, and Whiteside, Barnett and Co. Agricultural Works.

Geography
Brockport is located at  (43.214261, -77.939378).

Climate

Demographics

As of the census of 2020, there were 7,104 people, and 2,347  households, in the village.

The village's racial makeup was 84.0% White, 6% African American, 0.1% Native American, 2.9% Asian, 0.0% Pacific Islander, and 2.4% from two or more races. Hispanic or Latino people of any race were 5.8% of the population.

For 2010, there were 2,528 households, out of which 17.9% had children under the age of 18 living with them, 10.1% had a female householder with no husband present, and 56.7% were non-families. Of all households 33.9% were made up of individuals, and 7.8% had someone living alone who was 65 years of age or older. The average household size was 2.25 and the average family size was 2.86.

In the village, for 2010, the population was spread out, with 13.7% under the age of 18, 43.8% from 18 to 24, 16.4% from 25 to 44, 17.8% from 45 to 64, and 8.1% who were 65 years of age or older. The median age was 22.3 years. For every 100 females, there were 84.0 males. For every 100 females age 18 and over, there were 83.2 males.

For 2020, the village's median household income was $48,579. The village's per capita income was $20,108. About  18.9% of the population were below the poverty line.

Homicides
In 2009, Brockport saw its first homicide in 26 years in a shooting spree that ended in Canandaigua. On Saturday, February 14, 2009, shortly before 5 a.m., three people were shot, two fatally, by gunman Frank Garcia at Lakeside Memorial Hospital on West Ave. (NYS Route 19 Truck). Garcia later shot two other people dead. He was taken into custody the same day.

On September 29, 2012, the village saw only its second homicide occurrence when 22 year old Clayton Whittemore beat to death his 18-year-old girlfriend, Alexandra Kogut, inside her dorm room during his visit to the College at Brockport.

Notable people
 Ella D. Barrier
 Davis Carpenter, former US Congressman
 Larry Carpenter, theater and television director
 Jim Cosman, Major League baseball player
 Christopher John Farley, writer
 Martin Ferrero, actor
 Jon Finkel, professional Magic: The Gathering player
 Jerome Fuller, jurist
 William Heyen, poet
 Elias B. Holmes, former US Congressman
 Mary Jane Holmes (1825–1907), author of novels
 Sumner Howard, jurist and politician
 Carolyn Mackler, author
 Andy Parrino, professional baseball player
 Jeff Van Gundy, NBA coach and broadcaster
 Fannie Barrier Williams, social reformer and first African-American graduate of SUNY Brockport

References

External links

 SUNY Brockport webpage
 Brockport Central Schools webpage
 Seymour Library - public library serving Brockport, Clarkson, and Sweden, New York
 Images from in and around Brockport
 Brockport Symphony Orchestra

 
Rochester metropolitan area, New York
Erie Canal
Villages in Monroe County, New York
Villages in New York (state)
1822 establishments in New York (state)
Populated places established in 1822